Gergő Oláh may refer to:
 Gergő Oláh (footballer)
 Gergő Oláh (singer)